SKG may mean:

DreamWorks SKG, original name of the company (for founders Spielberg, Katzenberg, and Geffen)
SKG, IATA code for Thessaloniki Airport, Greece
SKG, station abbreviation for Sengkang MRT/LRT station, Singapore
Sandler Kahne Global Software